John Blaine Morrison Jr. is a United States Army lieutenant general currently serving as the deputy chief of staff for cyber (G-6) of the United States Army. Previously, he was the chief of staff of the United States Cyber Command.

References

Dwight D. Eisenhower School for National Security and Resource Strategy alumni
James Madison University alumni
Lieutenant generals
Living people
Place of birth missing (living people)
Recipients of the Defense Superior Service Medal
Recipients of the Distinguished Service Medal (US Army)
Recipients of the Legion of Merit
United States Army generals
United States Army personnel of the Gulf War
Webster University alumni
Year of birth missing (living people)